Stagmatophora phalacra is a moth in the family Cosmopterigidae. It was described by Edward Meyrick in 1909. It is found in South Africa.

References

Endemic moths of South Africa
Cosmopteriginae
Moths described in 1909
Moths of Africa